Royston A. Tickner (8 September 1922 – 7 July 1997) was a British actor.

Biography
Born Roy A. Tickner in Leicester, a tailor's son, he trained as an actor at Scarborough repertory theatre.

He served in the Royal Navy in World War II; however, in 1942 he was touring in the southern English counties, principally in H. F. Maltby's The Rotters with Frank Crawshaw and Preston Lockwood. In the winter of 1942–43 he was stage manager, and took the role of Robert, in the presentation of du Maurier's Rebecca at the Ambassadors Theatre in which Eileen Herlie made her London début, and then toured with the show. In that spring he married Gwendoline Bonde at Leicester. From 1947 he took a break from the theatre to work as a lighthouse keeper, miner, fireman and publican, before returning to acting in 1958.

Television roles
His television credits include: The Avengers, Z-Cars, Doctor Who (in the serials The Daleks' Master Plan and The Sea Devils), Gideon's Way, The Baron, King of the River, The Troubleshooters, Dixon of Dock Green, Timeslip, The Flaxton Boys, Out of the Unknown, Thorndyke, Emmerdale Farm, Porridge, Last of the Summer Wine, Some Mothers Do 'Ave 'Em, Angels, Return of the Saint, Rogue's Rock, Secret Army, Danger UXB, George and Mildred, The Enigma Files, Kessler, Minder, Reilly, Ace of Spies, Just Good Friends and One by One.

Film roles
Film roles include Tomescu in Michael Mann's The Keep (1983), and first Colonel in Jim Goddard's Hitler's SS: Portrait in Evil (1985).

Filmography

References

External links
 

1922 births
1997 deaths
English male television actors
People from Leicester
Male actors from Leicestershire
British publicans
20th-century British male actors
Royal Navy personnel of World War II